The Paris Institute of Criminology (French: Institut de criminologie de Paris) is the oldest French research institute for criminal law and criminology. Founded in 1922 as a component of the Faculty of Law of Paris, it has since been transferred to Panthéon-Assas University. It is also part of the International Center for Sociological Penal and Penitentiary Research and Studies of Messina, Italy.

The Institute of Criminology is dedicated to the study of crime and criminal behavior, with a focus on developing policies and strategies to prevent crime and ensure public safety. 

The Institute offers a range of programs for students at both the undergraduate and graduate levels.

Notable people
Émile Garçon
Henri Donnedieu de Vabres
Adeline Hazan

References

External links
Official website

Paris 2 Panthéon-Assas University
Criminology research institutes
Schools in Paris
Educational institutions established in 1922
1922 establishments in France